Král (feminine Králová) is a Czech surname meaning king. Notable people include:

 Alex Král (born 1998), Czech footballer
 Filip Král (born 1999), Czech ice hockey player
 Ivan Král (1948–2020), Czech musician
 Jan Král (born 1999), Czech footballer
 Jana Králová, Czech footballer
 Jaroslav Král (born 1948), Czech boxer
 Jiří Král (born 1981), Czech volleyball player
 Johann Král (1823–1912), Czech-born viola player
 Josef Král (born 1990), Czech professional racing driver
 Lucie Králová (born 1982), Czech dancer and model
 Lukáš Král (born 1976), Czech ice dancer
 Matej Král (born 1990), Slovak footballer
 Miroslav Král (born 1986), Czech footballer
 Oldřich Král (1930–2018), Czech sinologist
 Petr Král (born 1941), Czech writer
 Tereza Králová (born 1989), Czech athlete
 Tomáš Král (born 1992), Czech ice hockey goaltender
 Vojtěch Král (born 1988), Czech orienteering competitor
 Zuzana Králová (born 1985), Czech fashion designer

Czech-language surnames